The 2012 Guangzhou R&F F.C. season is Guangzhou's 1st season in the Chinese Super League since 2010. Guangzhou will also be competing in the Chinese FA Cup.

Coaching staff

Players 

As of 5 March 2012

Competitions

Chinese Super League

League table

Matches

Chinese FA Cup

References

Guangzhou City F.C. seasons
Guangzhou RandF F.C.